The canton of Cenon is an administrative division of the Gironde department, southwestern France. Its borders were modified at the French canton reorganisation which came into effect in March 2015. Its seat is in Cenon.

It consists of the following communes:
Bouliac
Cenon
Floirac

References

Cantons of Gironde